Scottish Recovery Network is a non-profit organization in Scotland that promotes mental health recovery.  Founded in 2004.  it is hosted by Penumbra and core funded by the Government of Scotland.

References

External links 
 

2004 establishments in Scotland
Organisations based in Scotland